The Acheron River, a minor inland perennial river of the Goulburn Broken catchment, part of the Murray-Darling basin, is located in the lower South Eastern Highlands bioregion and Northern Country/North Central regions of the Australian state of Victoria. The headwaters of the Acheron River rise on the northwestern slopes of the Yarra Ranges, below The Knobs and descend to flow into the Goulburn River near .

Location and features
The river rises below The Knobs on the northwestern slopes of the Yarra Ranges, part of the Great Dividing Range, within the Yarra Ranges National Park. The river descends  over its  course.

Etymology
In Australian Aboriginal languages, the river is variously named Agaroon, Nyaggeron, Ngaragon, and Niagaroon with no defined meanings for each of the words.

The origin of the river's current name is thought to be derived from the Latin spelling of Greek Akheron or "River of Woe", from akhos, meaning "distress". The Acheron was one of the rivers of the underworld or Kingdom of Hades, and also the name of a river in Epirus, Greece.

See also

References

Goulburn Broken catchment
Rivers of Greater Melbourne (region)
Rivers of Hume (region)
Tributaries of the Goulburn River